Psychrobacter luti is a species of bacterium first isolated from Antarctic environments. It is a psychrophilic, oxidase-positive, halotolerant, Gram-negative, nonmotile coccobacillus with a strictly oxidative metabolism. Its type strain is NF11T (=LMG 21276T =CECT 5885T).

References

Further reading

External links
LPSN
Type strain of Psychrobacter luti at BacDive -  the Bacterial Diversity Metadatabase

Moraxellaceae
Bacteria described in 2003